Priestfield may refer to:

 Priestfield, Wolverhampton, an area of Wolverhampton, UK
 Priestfield tram stop on the Midland Metro line
 Priestfield railway station on the Oxford, Worcester and Wolverhampton Railway, open from 1854 to 1972
 Priestfield, Herefordshire, a village
 Priestfield, Medway, an area of Rochester, Kent granted by King Ethelbert of Kent to Rochester Cathedral
 Priestfield Stadium, the home of Gillingham FC, Kent, UK
 Priestfield House, a former country house in Fife, Scotland
 Prestonfield, Edinburgh, formerly Priestfield, the name retained in some institutions and street names

See also
 Priestfields, a neighbourhood of Middlesbrough